Saham Club is an Omani sports club based in Saham, Oman. The club is currently playing in the Oman Professional League, top division of Oman Football Association. Their home stadium is Sohar Regional Sports Complex. The stadium is government owned, but they also own their own personal stadium and sports equipments, as well as their own training facilities.

History
The club was founded on 24 April 1972 and registered on 26 June 2002.

The club was promoted to the Omani League after winning the final of 2007-08 First Division League, where the club defeated Al-Shabab Club on penalties.

The club caused a major upset when they beat 7-time Sultan Qaboos Cup winners, Dhofar in 2009, receiving their first ever Sultan Qaboos Cup title. Their most recent achievement was in 2013 when they won the first OPL Cup against Al-Seeb Club 3–2 on penalties after the match had ended 0–0 in normal time.

Being a multisport club
Although being mainly known for their football, Saham SC like many other clubs in Oman, have not only football in their list, but also hockey, volleyball, handball, basketball, badminton and squash. They also have a youth football team competing in the Omani Youth League.

Crest and colours
Saham SC have been known since establishment to wear a full blue or white (Away) kit (usually a darker shade of blue). They have also had many different sponsors over the years. As of now, Uhlsport provides them with kits.

Achievements
Sultan Qaboos Cup (2): 
Winners: 2009, 2016.

Oman Professional League Cup (1):
Winners: 2013.
Runners-up: 2012.

Oman Super Cup (2): 
Winners: 2010, 2016

Oman First Division League (1): 
Winners: 2011–12.

International titles
GCC Champions League (0): 
Runners-up: 2014.

Club performance-International Competitions

AFC competitions
AFC Cup : 1 appearance
2010 : Group Stage

UAFA competitions
GCC Champions League: 10 appearances
2011 : Group Stage
2014 : Runners-up

Current squad

|-----
! colspan="9" bgcolor="#B0D3FB" align="left" |
|----- bgcolor="#DFEDFD"

|-----
! colspan="9" bgcolor="#B0D3FB" align="left" |
|----- bgcolor="#DFEDFD"

|-----
! colspan="9" bgcolor="#B0D3FB" align="left" |
|----- bgcolor="#DFEDFD"

Personnel

Current technical staff

References

External links
Saham SC – SOCCERWAY
Saham SC Profile – GOALZZ.com

Football clubs in Oman
Oman Professional League
Saham
Association football clubs established in 1972
1972 establishments in Oman